HMS Serene was an  destroyer, which served with the Royal Navy. Launched on 30 November 1918 just after the end of the First World War, the ship was commissioned into the Reserve Fleet. Excluding a brief expedition to Latvia near to the end of that nation's War of Independence in 1919, the destroyer remained in reserve at Devonport until 1936. During this period, the condition of the destroyer deteriorated. Then, as part of a deal for the liner Majestic, Serene was sold to be broken up on 14 September.

Design and development

Serene was one of thirty-three Admiralty  destroyers ordered by the British Admiralty in June 1917 as part of the Twelfth War Construction Programme. Differences with the R class were minor, such as having the searchlight moved aft.

Two funnels were fitted.

Armament consisted of three QF  Mk IV guns on the ship's centreline.  One was mounted raised on the forecastle, one on a platform between the funnels and one aft. The ship also mounted a single  2-pounder pom-pom anti-aircraft gun for air defence. Four  torpedo tubes were fitted in two twin rotating mounts aft. The ship was designed to mount two additional  torpedo tubes either side of the superstructure but this required the forecastle plating to be cut away, making the vessel very wet, so they were removed. The weight saved enabled the heavier Mark V 21-inch torpedo to be carried. The ship had a complement of 90 officers and ratings.

Construction and career
Laid down on 2 February 1918 by William Denny and Brothers in Dumbarton with the yard number 1102, Serene was launched on 30 November, shortly after the Armistice which ended the First World War. The vessel was the first that served in the Royal Navy to be named Serene. Serene was completed on 30 April the following year and commissioned into the Reserve Fleet at Devonport.

Serene remained in reserve until the following year. Although the war had finished, the escalating civil war in Russia continued. The United Kingdom decided to send units of the Royal Navy into the Baltic Sea to monitor the situation. Soon into the campaign, it became clear that the Russians were planning to liberate the Baltic State of Latvia by integrating it into the new Soviet Union. The fleet was therefore tasked with not simply helping to help organise the evacuation of German forces from the country but also support their War of Independence. This was achieved on 14 November 1919.

The destroyer returned to the United Kingdom and was once again reduced to reserve at Devonport on 15 September 1920. Like many of the class stored in reserve, the ship deteriorated and by the middle of the next decade was considered by the Admiralty to be in too poor condition to return to operations. Serene remained in reserve until 14 September 1936 when the ship was given to Thos. W. Ward of Sheffield in exchange for the liner Majestic. The destroyer was subsequently broken up at Inverkeithing.

Pennant numbers

References

Citations

Bibliography

 
 
 
 
 
 
 
 
 
 
 

1918 ships
Ships built on the River Clyde
S-class destroyers (1917) of the Royal Navy